Broadsword or basket-hilted sword is an early modern military sword.

Broadsword may also refer to:
 Chinese broadsword, a wide-edged variety of the Chinese sabre or dao
 Claymore, a basket hilt arming sword of Scottish origin

Entertainment
BroadSword Comics
"Broadsword", a song by Jethro Tull from The Broadsword and the Beast
Broadsword Interactive, the developers of Dance Factory and Ultima Online

Ships
Broadsword class frigate or Type 22 frigate
HMS Broadsword (D31), a 1946 British Royal Navy ship
HMS Broadsword (F88), a 1975 British Royal Navy ship
HMS Broadsword, a fictional Royal Navy Destroyer in Jeffrey Archer's First Among Equals
HMS Broadsword, a list of ships named HMS Broadsword

People with the name
Joyce M. Broadsword, U.S. politician

See also 
Classification of swords#Broadsword
Types of swords
SS Empire Broadsword